Hrvoje Barić (born 21 July 1965) is a Croatian former swimmer who competed in the 100 m butterfly event of the 1984 Summer Olympics, where he was eliminated in the heats. He placed 6th in the same event at the 1989 European Aquatics Championships.

References

1965 births
Living people
Croatian male swimmers
Male butterfly swimmers
Olympic swimmers of Yugoslavia
Yugoslav male swimmers
Swimmers at the 1984 Summer Olympics
Sportspeople from Split, Croatia
Swimmers at the 1991 Mediterranean Games
Mediterranean Games gold medalists for Yugoslavia
Mediterranean Games medalists in swimming